"Resolve" is the third single from Foo Fighters album In Your Honor. It was released on 21 November 2005. It has been released on two different discs. In The West Wing episode, "Election Day Part II", the band is seen playing this song at a campaign party for Democratic Presidential candidate Matt Santos.

Track listings

Music video
The video was directed by Michael Palmieri, who also directed the video for the previous single, "DOA". Most of the music video was filmed in Duarte, CA, the rest being green/blue screened to have the band playing under a C.G.I. lighthouse. The video begins with Dave Grohl crossing Route 66 (Huntington Dr.) to a "Sushi for Less" restaurant, with wind chimes ringing in the background. He enters the restaurant seeing few people (played by the other band members). He is greeted by an attractive Asian waitress. After being seated Grohl is waited on by a male Asian double of himself, including his tattoos and T-shirt, minus the Motörhead logo. Nate Mendel starts to get bored looking at the live crustacean in his cup and starts balancing a fork and a spoon on the rim of a glass. Taylor Hawkins tries to better this by balancing a salt shaker in a small pile of salt. Grohl hums and sings along to his own song being played on a radio and television. In an extended daydream of sequence, Grohl envisions himself as the scuba suited toy in the restaurant's aquarium as a mermaid, who resembles the restaurant's waitress, swims towards him. (The bottle at his feet with the red liquid is a reference to the video for "DOA") After a moment of bubbling love hearts at each other, she detaches his air hose and the glass in his helmet cracks. At the same time, Mendel knocks the glass off the table and Hawkins knocks over the salt shaker. Before the glass hits the ground, Chris Shiflett catches it and puts it back on the table. Still daydreaming, Grohl finds he is able to breathe under water and he swims away with the mermaid. As Shiflett asks Mendel to show him how to balance the fork and spoon on the glass, Grohl is snapped back to reality by the waitress handing him the bill. The video premiered on British television long before it premiered in the United States.

Personnel
 Dave Grohl – vocals, rhythm guitar
 Chris Shiflett – lead guitar
 Nate Mendel – bass
 Taylor Hawkins – drums

Chart positions

References

External links

2005 singles
Foo Fighters songs
Songs written by Dave Grohl
Songs written by Taylor Hawkins
Songs written by Nate Mendel
Songs written by Chris Shiflett
Song recordings produced by Nick Raskulinecz